"So Much Love" is a 1992 song and the debut single by Malaika, released on A&M Records.

The composition, written by the singer herself, D'Mosis and Rodney K. Jackson, was the lead single of her only album released to date, Sugar Time. The song charted at number five on the U.S. Billboard Hot Dance Music/Club Play and at number six on the Canadian Dance/Urban Singles Chart.

Credits and personnel
 Malaika – lead vocals, writer
 D'Mosis – writer,
 Rodney K. Jackson – writer, producer
 Felipe Delgado - programming
 David Morales - additional producer, remix

Track listings
 12" Maxi, UK, AMX 0084
 "So Much Love (Techno Mix)" - 5:51
 "So Much Love (Original Mix)" - 6:46
 "So Much Love (Bassman Mix)" - 5:52

 12" Maxi, US, Promo, 31458 8034-1
 12" Maxi, US, Promo, Test Pressing, 31458 8034-1

 "So Much Love (Bassman Mix)" - 5:52
 "So Much Love (Original Mix)" - 6:46
 "So Much Love (Techno Mix)" - 5:51

 12" Maxi, UK & Europe, AMY 0084/580084-1
 12" Maxi, UK & Europe, Promo, AMYDJ 0084/580 0084-1
 "So Much Love (12" Remix)" - 7:36
 "So Much Love (12" Choice Mix)" - 7:23
 "So Much Love (Classic Dub)" - 7:00
 "So Much Love (Dub Mix)" - 6:12

 CD Maxi, US, Promo, 31458 8034-2
 "So Much Love (Radio Mix)" - 4:09
 "So Much Love (Choice Radio Mix)" - 4:12
 "So Much Love (Original Radio Remix)" - 3:56
 "So Much Love (12" Remix)" - 7:36
 "So Much Love (12" Choice Mix)" - 7:23

 CD Maxi, UK, AMCD 084/580 084-2
 "So Much Love (12" Remix Edit)" - 3:58
 "So Much Love (12" Remix)" - 7:38
 "So Much Love (Choice 7")" - 4:27
 "So Much Love (Choice 12")" - 7:23
 "So Much Love (Classic Dub)" - 7:00
 "So Much Love (Dub Mix)" - 6:14

 12" Maxi, US, 31458 0071-1
 "So Much Love (12" Remix)" - 7:36
 "So Much Love (Dub Mix)" - 6:12
 "So Much Love (Radio Mix)" - 4:09
 "So Much Love (12" Choice Mix)" - 7:23
 "So Much Love (Classic Instrumental)" - 6:55
 "So Much Love (Techno Mix)" - 5:51

 12" Maxi, US, Double, 31458 8034-1
 "So Much Love (12" Remix)" - 7:36
 "So Much Love (Dub Mix)" - 6:12
 "So Much Love (12" Choice Mix)" - 7:23
 "So Much Love (Classic Instrumental)" - 6:55
 "So Much Love (Bassman Mix)" - 5:52
 "So Much Love (Original Mix)" - 6:46
 "So Much Love (Techno Mix)" - 5:51

Charts

Peak chart positions

References

External links
 

1992 singles
House music songs
1992 songs
A&M Records singles